Port Road may refer to:
Port Road, Adelaide, South Australia
Port Road, Kollam, South India
Icknield Port Road railway station, Birmingham, England
Port Road Branch, rail branch line serving Port Deposit, Maryland
Port Road, a nickname of the Portpatrick and Wigtownshire Joint Railway in Scotland